Henricus Coenradus Nicolaas "Hein" Vergeer (born 2 May 1961) is a Dutch former speed skater who became both European and World Allround Champion in both 1985 (in which year he also became National Sprint Champion) and 1986 (in which year he also became National Allround Champion).

Hein Vergeer was a dominant allround skater, but after recovering from an injury, he was never able to reach that same level again. Because of this, he was unable to fulfil his wish of winning an Olympic medal – at the 1988 Winter Olympics in Calgary, Vergeer competed in the 500 m, the 1,000 m, and the 1,500 m, but his best result was a mere fifteenth place. He had also competed in those same three distances at the Winter Olympics in Sarajevo four years earlier, but did not do much better than with a tenth place as his best result. His best years were in between those two Winter Olympics.

Despite his dominance, Vergeer never managed to skate any world records. This could label him as a "true" all-round skater – very good at all distances, but never the best in any single distance.

Vergeer lived during his skating years in Haastrecht, a town where Leo Visser, another former World Champion speed skating, also used to live. Both skaters used to train at the skating club STV Lekstreek.

Back in the days of Vergeer's dominance, speed skating was not very lucrative, so Vergeer did what many other top skaters in those days did – he used his fame as a stepping stone to a career in marketing and communication. Vergeer currently is an advisor of several ventures and he organises events.

In 2006 and 2007, Vergeer participated in the Holiday on Ice show called Fantasy.

Personal records
To put these personal records in perspective, the last column (Notes) lists the official world records on the dates that Vergeer skated his personal records.

Source:

Note that Vergeer's personal record on the 3000 meter was not a world record because Leo Visser skated 3:59.27 that same day at the same tournament. Also note that when Vergeer set his personal record on the 10000 meter Geir Karlstad set a new world record of 14:12.14 that same day at the same tournament.

Vergeer has an Adelskalender score of 161.193 points. His highest ranking on the Adelskalender was a seventh place. The Adelskalender is an all-time allround speed skating ranking.

Tournament overview

Source:

Medals won

Medals

An overview of medals won by Vergeer at important championships he participated in, listing the years in which he won each:

References

External links
Hein Vergeer at SkateResults.com
Personal records from Jakub Majerski's Speedskating Database
Evert Stenlund's Adelskalender pages
Complete history list of World Records From the International Skating Union

1961 births
Living people
Dutch male speed skaters
Olympic speed skaters of the Netherlands
Speed skaters at the 1984 Winter Olympics
Speed skaters at the 1988 Winter Olympics
People from Vlist
World Allround Speed Skating Championships medalists
Sportspeople from South Holland